Philip C. Bolger (December 3, 1927 – May 24, 2009) was a prolific American boat designer, who was born and lived in Gloucester, Massachusetts. He began work full-time as a draftsman for boat designers Lindsay Lord and then John Hacker in the early 1950s.

Bolger's first boat design was a 32-foot (9.75 m) sportfisherman published in the January 1952 issue of Yachting magazine. He subsequently designed more than 668 different boats, from a 114-foot-10-inch (35 m) replica of an eighteenth-century naval warship, the frigate Surprise (ex-Rose), to the 6-foot-5-inch (1.96 m) plywood box-like dinghy Tortoise.

Although his designs ranged through the full spectrum of boat types, Bolger tended to favor simplicity over complexity. Many of his hulls are made from sheet materials — typically plywood — and have hard chines. A subclass of these designed in association with Harold Payson called Instant Boats were so named because they were intended to be easily built by amateurs out of commonly available materials. Bolger also advocated the use of traditional sailing rigs and leeboards.

From the 1990s, Phil Bolger teamed with his wife Susanne Altenburger, designing boats under the name Phil Bolger & Friends Inc. During this time, they emphasized the design of sustainable and fuel-efficient boats for the fishing industry. Also, they participated in a large military commission with the Naval Sea Systems Command on new designs for military landing craft utility boats.

Bolger was a prolific writer and wrote many books, the last being Boats with an Open Mind, as well as hundreds of magazine articles on small craft designs, chiefly in Woodenboat, Small Boat Journal and Messing About in Boats.

Bolger died on May 24, 2009, of a self-inflicted gunshot wound. His wife explained that "[h]is mind had slipped in the last several months, and he wanted to control the end of his life while he was still able."

Instant Boats
Phil Bolger was unconventional in many ways and, among many large boats, yachts and custom designs, took an interest in what he termed "evolving crafty ways of building boats". As far back as 1957 he designed "Poohsticks"  as a small plywood rowing skiff to be simply and economically built at home (originally by his brother). From this simple start he went on to develop a large number of designs for small- and medium-sized craft using plywood as a material for one-off construction at home or by small boatyards.

In the 1970s, Phil Bolger began a long and successful collaboration with Harold 'Dynamite' Payson with Bolger designing the boats and Payson building them as well as selling plans and writing books about how to do it. 'Dynamite' called the first series of easy-to-build plywood boats "Instant Boats". Unlike traditional boat construction which involves building of jig and full size lofting of the shape of the hull prior to construction, the Instant Boat method uses shaped plywood panels on pre-shaped frames made of plywood and standard dimensional lumberyard wood. This results in quick construction and less requirement for skilled craftsmanship, and has proved appealing to amateur boat builders as well as many later designers who have followed in his footsteps, albeit much less prolifically.

Following articles in WoodenBoat magazine, Dynamite Payson published Instant Boats (1979, 152 pages, 7" × 10", 48 illustrations). It describes the original "Instant Boat" technique. Generically known as the "chine log method" or "simplified chine log method" the technique consists of (i) cutting body panels to a predetermined shape as given on the plans, (ii) wrapping them around frames or bulkheads, (iii) adding chines (small section planks of lumberyard wood) along the joints (either internally or externally) and fastening them together using glue and mechanical fasteners (nails or screws). The book described all the basic techniques (gluing, nailing and screwing with some fiberglass) to produce five designs: 12' Teal, 7'9" Elegant Punt, 12' Kayak, 31' Folding Schooner, 15'6" Surf, and 20'9" Zephyr. All these boats have single chines (i.e. have a bottom panel and two sides) and have their shape limited by the bevels given to the chines. The boats in Paysons book were designed for use on protected waters and none was self-bailing or designed to self-recover in case of capsize. However, Bolger designed many other boats using this building technique, including the ocean crossing AS-39 (or Loose Moose II) as well as a significant number of other boats.

Bolger's first generation of "chine log instant boats" for home building was followed by a generation of "stitch and glue" (aka "tack and tape") boats. This technique was made possible by the evolution of glues and the massification of polyester and epoxy resins combined with fiberglass tape. The new technique basically did away with the chine logs and mechanical fasteners and all the problems associated with their use (mainly the limitation of shape in the design phase, the carpentry challenge in the construction phase and damp/rot in the medium to long term). Instead of using a chine to join the precut panels, in stitch and glue, the preshaped panels are wrapped around bulkheads and/or frames in the same way as before. However, the panels are only temporarily held in place using nails, duct tape, cable ties, masking tape, wire or other mechanical means, while the seams are filled (both inside and outside the hull) with a resin and filler paste covered in one or more layers of fiberglass cloth or tape which in turn is saturated in resin. Once the resin hardens, the mechanical joint is stronger than the joined plywood and therefore structurally sound. Payson again popularised the technique in his book Build the New Instant Boats (1984, 160 pages, 8" × 11", 110 illustrations - Also still in print). In this book Payson introduces what he termed "Tack and tape" to the greater American public. The book includes plans for Gypsy (15' sail/oar/outboard), Nymph (7'9" dinghy with sail option), Diablo (15' motor boat for up to 25 HP outboard) as well as 8 more "traditional instant boats" using the chine log method: 16' Lug-rigger Windsprint, 6'5" Tortoise, 8' Skimmer, Dynamite Sailboard, 16'June Bug, Madeline a 19'6" Pedal-driven sidewheeler and the 23'6" Light Schooner. In 2007 Payson published his last book Instant Boatbuilding with Dynamite Payson which basically explains both techniques in less detail than the previous books and presents complete plans for 15 boats by Bolger. These are: Stitch and Glue: Payson's Pirogue (13' - canoe), Cartopper (11'6" - sail/oar), Sweet Pea (15' - sail/oar), Ruben's Nymph (7'9" - identical to Nymph but 1' wider - sail/oar), Diablo Grande (18' - power), Catfish (15' - sail/outboard) and Chebacco (19'8" - sail/outboard). The

Sharpies

Bolger put a lot of thought into relatively cheap, high-performance boats. He is well known for designing a series of single chine sharpies, typically long and narrow with a flat bottom.

According to Bolger, sailing sharpies give good performance for the amount of sail they carry because of low to moderate displacement and light weight. In his opinion, the sharpie shape provides a simple construction in the plywood era with the added benefit that sailing sharpies extend the waterline as they heel, thereby effectively increasing the hull speed. Power sharpies can use low-horsepower motors (see, for example, the Bolger Tennessee, and Sneakeasy designs) yet reach planing speeds in sheltered waters. Major critics of sharpies point to the fact that they tend to pound under certain conditions and that the relatively shallow draft makes them unseaworthy. Their advocates (including Bolger) point to the fact that they are exceptionally good boats for their cost, make excellent day boats and are increasingly seaworthy as (i) the length to beam ratio increases, (ii) they are adequately ballasted and (iii) they are given reserve stability and/or made watertight sufficiently to ensure that they self-right in the event of a capsize. Sharpies may be considered one of the simplest types of boat from the construction point of view. However, their design is controversial and primarily dependent on the intended use.

Bolger is particularly known for his Square Boats (derogatorily known as "Bolger Boxes"). Bolger reasoned that a simple rockered bottom and vertical sides gives the most volume, and form stability, on a given beam. After experimenting and studying traditional sharpies and the writings of small-boat historian Howard I. Chapelle and others, he developed the theory that the optimum chine line for a sailing sharpie should represent a regular curve without breaks, changes in radius or straight sections. He further reasoned that the curve of side and bottom should match as much as possible to reduce turbulence. He further reasoned that the sharpie was an ideal shape for a trailer sailer with either leeboards or bilgeboards to provide lateral plane.  Bolger felt that the traditional sharpie shape Chapelle had documented based on traditional New England sharpies (with a slightly different chine profile) was inefficient and prone to causing steering difficulties.

Both designers thought traditional rigs and boat types were suitable for small yachts, especially sailing boats. Generally, Chapelle noted that neither transom nor bow should be immersed when the boat is loaded, a point on which Bolger agreed. Later in his career Phil Bolger and Friends developed modifications to the simple sharpie bow to avoid hull slap at anchor at the expense of a much more complex geometry.

Bolger evolved the concept of traditional sharpies and by squaring off the bow and stern to give the longest useful waterline. Most were configured as yawls (with main mast quite far forward and a small mizzen far aft). The bow on these designs is cut off and blunt and the sterns are vertical. In some designe an open bow can allow passage to land if the boat is beached, space for holding anchors and cables, or clearance to step and unstep a mast. Oldshoe, Micro and Long Micro have shallow ballasted full length keels whereas what he called the "Advanced Sharpies" AS19, AS29 and AS39 have one or two bilgeboards and inside ballast. The latter are very definitely in the extended cruise/liveaboard category.

Leeboards and rigs

Bolger championed leeboards as low-tech and practical, to the chagrin of many yachties. The conventional wisdom is that they are ugly. Even many of his centerboard designs had boards that were off-center or all the way to one side or the other (for example, the Birdwatcher and the AS29). He concluded that a single leeboard is sufficient in many cases on small boats, and that rigs could be stepped off the centerline without much effect on performance. Bolger advocated leeboards as being a simple means of providing lateral plane to all types of sailing vessel, eliminating many of the disadvantages of centerboards, daggerboards and keels, following broadly in the concepts of L. Francis Herreshoff, various years his senior and, as stated by Bolger, one of the most influential yacht designers from his perspective.

He used traditional rigs, from the simplest "Cat rig" (single sail) through sloops, many yawls and schooners at a time when almost all other designers were concentrating purely on racing rule derived sloops. The diversity of rigs was accompanied by a broad spectrum of sails including the sprit-boomed leg of mutton, the sprit sail, the gaff sail, the lug sail and the lateen in addition to the classic Bermudan/marconi rig. His book '100 Sailing Rigs "Straight talk"' later reedited as '103 Sailing Rigs "Straight talk"' provides a fascinating look at both rig configurations and sail types as well as his insight into a subject in which he was undoubtedly an expert.

His experience over the years with well over 600 designs allowed him ample space to experiment with all kinds of designs, rigs and materials. His comments on each subject in books as well as articles published in magazines of the period are based on his research, analysis, first hand experience and use of the different configurations. He is further very clear in explaining the mistakes and corrections he made in each case, and why.

Later years - Advanced Gloucester Fisherman Project

Beginning in November 2002, Bolger and Altenberger began a  re-examination of  fisheries economics, as a result of the partial collapse of the industry both globally and locally in their hometown of Gloucester, Massachusetts. Their proposal centered on the principle that, in an era of high fuel cost and economic pressure for modernization of depressed fishing ports, sustainable fisheries require a balance of business economics and public planning versus the available fishery resources.

They argued the key to this was a restructuring of the fishing fleet towards boats with lower complexity, lower initial cost, better fuel economy, and lower operating costs.

Large expensive complex boats demand taking a high number of fish to be economical. Simpler, lower powered, and lower cost boats can still be economical with lower fish catch rates.

Bolger and Altenberger expressed concern that existing governmental fishing permits issued based on length of the fishing boat, created an incentive to use inefficient wide and deep fishing boat hulls. If the fishing permits were issued based instead on displacement tonnage of the hull, then the incentive would be for the fishing industry to use long, narrow and shallow hulls which would be more economical to purchase and to operate per ton of fish caught.

The existing fishing fleet, composed of ever larger boats with high construction costs, debt loads and operational costs, in the long run forced fishermen to search for ever increasing catch sizes to remain economic while in a fight against regulatory quotas.

Bolger and Altenburger argued that, ultimately, fishermen would find it more economically sustainable to do more with less. A consolidated fleet of smaller more economical vessels could make it possible for fishermen to survive with lower catch rates, lower debt load, lower fuel burn, lower insurance rates and lower depreciation.

This idea was described in the September 2004 issue of the magazine National Fisherman, and again in 2007 as a series of essays published in the magazine Messing About in Boats. The project to build a prototype was authorised but was never developed on any significant commercial scale within Phil Bolger's lifetime.

Design list
Listed below are a selection of more commonly encountered designs by Phil Bolger.

External links

Bolger-related websites
 Square Boats -  dedicated to Bolger's boxy sharpies
 Instant Boats online catalogue - a catalogue of the  Instant Boat class of Bolger plywood boats
 Messing About in Boats magazine - Phil Bolger and Friends currently publish a regular article in the magazine Messing About in Boats.
 Yahoo! Bolger Group  - a Yahoo! discussion group dedicated to Bolger's designs
 Bolger Design Database - The Bolger Yahoo! group maintains a partial listing of Bolger boat designs.
 Bolger Boats on the Web - a large collection of websites with photos of Bolger Boats under construction and on the water

Bolger rowboats 
 Nymph, design #455

Bolger sailboats 
 Sweet Pea Peapod 'Sweet Pea' design
 Birdwatcher I 
 Birdwatcher II 
 Seabird '86, design #525

 Superbrick

 Schorpioen, design #649, trailerable, foldable, trimaran. This design was commissioned by Edward Medalis but he never built his dream boat.
 Eeek!, 11'9" sailing canoe
 Bolger Peero, shareware plans for the 12-foot Peero, or tiny sailing sharpie canoe. Published in Messing About in Boats. A successor to Eeek!

Bolger power boats 
 Barge Houseboat, design #481
 Bonefish Concept, a 20"0" × 7'9" × 1"6" sportfisher with air-cooled engine.

Bibliography

Notes

1927 births
2009 suicides
Multihull designers
American naval architects
People from Gloucester, Massachusetts
Suicides by firearm in Massachusetts
Bowdoin College alumni